was a Sengoku period samurai and early Edo period daimyō under the Tokugawa shogunate of Japan. His courtesy title was Kunai-no-taifu.

Biography
Sakai Tadakatsu was the sixth son of Sakai Ietsugu, castellan of Yoshida Castle and son of Sakai Tadatsugu (1527–1596), who was a vassal of Tokugawa Ieyasu. Tadakatsu's childhood name was Kogōrō, and when he underwent his genpuku ceremony, he was awarded a kanji from the name of Shōgun Tokugawa Hidetada as a special mark of favor, becoming "Tadakatsu".<ref>Plutschow, Herbert. (1995). [https://books.google.com/books?id=fNQjDQ-mWYgC&q=sakai+tadayuki&pg=PA53  "Japan's Name Culture: The Significance of Names in a Religious, Political and Social Context, p.53.]</ref> 

He became daimyō of Takada Domain in Echigo Province (100,000 koku) on the death of his father in 1618. However, only one year later, he was transferred to Matsushiro Domain in Shinano Province by order of the shogunate, with the same nominal kokudaka. Three years later, in 1622, when the shogunate dispossessed the Mogami clan, Tadakatsu was transferred again, to become daimyō of Shōnai Domain. At that time, his kokudaka was increased to 138,000 koku. One of his first actions on becoming daimyō of Shōnai was to begin the construction of Tsuruoka Castle as a replacement for the dilapidated Kamegasaki Castle. However, the completed Tsuruoka Castle was given to his grandson, Sakai Tadayoshi, and he continued to reside at the old Kamegasaki Castle after his retirement. It was unusual for a domain, especially of this size, to have two castles in violation of the shogunate's "one domain - one castle" edict, and was a mark of the high standing the Sakai clan enjoyed within the shogunate. On the other hand, funding of this castle resulted in higher taxation, which caused unrest in the domain, even to the point where petitions were sent directly to the shogunate in Edo in 1634 complaining about misgovernment.

In his final years, Tadakatsu instigated an O-Ie Sōdō by attempting to disinherit his own son, Sakai Tadamasa, in favor of his younger brother, Sakai Tadashige in 1642. This action was greatly opposed by the domain's senior advisors and karō and Tadakatsu died in 1647 before the issue was resolved. The ō Matsudaira Nobutsuna ruled in favor of Sakai Tadamasa as successor.

 References 
Papinot, Edmond. (1906) Dictionnaire d'histoire et de géographie du japon. Tokyo: Librarie Sansaisha...Click link for digitized 1906 Nobiliaire du japon (2003)
Asano Gengo 浅野源吾(1976). Shōnai-han shi 庄內藩史. Ed. by Tōhoku Shinkōkai 東北振興会. Tokyo: Tōyō shoin 東洋書院.
 The content of much of this article was derived from that of the corresponding article on Japanese Wikipedia.''

Footnotes

1594 births
1647 deaths
Fudai daimyo
Sakai clan